Trigo, California may refer to:
 Trigo, Madera County, California
 Trigo, San Joaquin County, California